London Victoria Carriage Holding Sidings, also known as Grosvenor Road Carriage Sidings, is a stabling point located in Westminster, London, England. The stabling point is situated on the western side of the Chatham Main Line, to the south of London Victoria station.

London Victoria Depot is on the opposite side of the line.

History 
In 2004, Class 365, 377, 421 and 423 EMUs could be seen there.

Present 
As of 2018, stabling is provided for Southern Class 377 and 455 EMUs and Southeastern Class 375 EMUs.

References

Sources

Railway depots in London